Marija Režan (born Vrsaljko, on 8 August 1989 in Zadar, SFR Yugoslavia) is a Croatian basketball player. At the 2012 Summer Olympics, she competed for the national team of Croatia in the women's event. She is 6 ft 6 inches tall. She plays for İstanbul Üniversitesi.

Club career
  Zadar (2006-2008), Gospić (2008–12)
  Avenida (2012–2015)
  İstanbul Üniversitesi (2015– )

References

External links
Profile at eurobasket.com

1989 births
Living people
Basketball players from Zadar
Centers (basketball)
Croatian women's basketball players
Croatian expatriate basketball people in Spain
Croatian expatriate basketball people in Turkey
Basketball players at the 2012 Summer Olympics
Olympic basketball players of Croatia
ŽKK Gospić players